Cork X Southwest Music & Arts Festival was an annual festival in Skibbereen, West Cork, Ireland.

2011 saw the festival in its fourth year. The festival took place on Liss Ard Estate in Skibbereen, West Cork on Saturday 4 June & Sunday 5 June.

2011
The fourth annual Cork x Southwest music festival took place on 4 June 2011.

The artists performing at the 2011 Cork X SW Music Festival include:
 Echo & The Bunnymen
 Patti Smith
 Peter Hook & The Light
 Balkan Beat Box
 Spider John Koerner
 Mick Flannery
 Fred
 Favourite Sons
 Jape
 Interference

2010
The third annual Cork x Southwest music festival took place on Saturday 31 July 2010.

The artists performing included:
 Martha Wainwright
 Bonnie Prince Billy
 Hothouse Flowers
 The Frank and Walters
 Mick Flannery
 John Spillane
 Luka Bloom

Sponsorship
The main sponsor for the Cork x Southwest music festival is Murphy's Irish Stout.

References

Annual events in Ireland
Music festivals in Ireland
Folk festivals in Ireland
Summer events in the Republic of Ireland